Ignacio García López (5 September 1924 – 20 December 2017) was a Spanish politician who served as Minister Secretary-General of the Movement between 1976 and 1977 and briefly as Minister Secretary of the Government in 1977.

References

1932 births
2017 deaths
Labour ministers of Spain
Politicians from Madrid